The Iglesia de San Carlos Borromeo is a historic church built in 1783, located on the plaza of Aguadilla, Puerto Rico. It was listed on the U.S. National Register of Historic Places in 1984.

It is one of five churches with architecture designed by State Architect Pedro Cobreros.

Description
The original church was built in 1783.  An octagonal tower at the north was added in 1862, and another to the south in 1874.  The facade was revised in 1887 according to plans designed by Cobreros.  After the 1918 San Fermín earthquake the south tower was rebuilt, lower than before, and the facade was somewhat changed.

The church includes two aisles and a nave covered with a flat roof.  It is reportedly the only church in Puerto Rico with an apse covered by a groin vault rather than a dome or a barrel vault.

It is one of 31 churches reviewed for listing on the National Register in 1984.

The church was last remodeled in 1971.

Gallery

See also
National Register of Historic Places listings in western Puerto Rico

References

External links
San Carlos Borromeo Church, at geocities

National Register of Historic Places in Aguadilla, Puerto Rico
Churches on the National Register of Historic Places in Puerto Rico
Roman Catholic churches in Puerto Rico
1783 establishments in New Spain
Roman Catholic churches completed in 1783
1780s establishments in the Spanish West Indies
18th-century establishments in Puerto Rico